Leininger is a surname. Notable people with the surname include:

Claus Leininger (1931–2005), German theatre director and manager 
Dannette Leininger (born 1963), American handball player
James R. Leininger, American businessman
Madeleine Leininger (1925–2012), American nurse

See also
Leininger Peak, mountain of Antarctica